John Woolford may refer to:
 John Woolford (muse), muse, confidant and the first romantic interest of the composer Benjamin Britten
 John L. Woolford Jr., American biologist
 John Elliott Woolford, British draftsman, painter and architect

See also
 John Wolford, American football quarterback
 Johnny Wolford, English rugby league player